Amauna is a village located in the Forbesganj Block of Araria district in the Indian state of Bihar.

References

Villages in Araria district